Mutthi Bhar Chawal (A Handful of Rice) is a 1978 Pakistani classical Urdu film based on a short novel of Rajinder Singh Bedi, Ek Chadar Maili Si. Directed by Sangeeta and composed by Kamal Ahmed, it features Sangeeta, Nadeem Baig, Kaveeta, Rahat Kazmi, and Ghulam Mohiuddin in lead roles. It is one of the greatest hits of Sangeeta and debut film of Syed Noor as a screenwriter.

The film is about a
village life and struggle of a family to survive after father dies and a village woman becomes widowed as a result. It is one of the Pakistani films with the maximum number of awards won, including five Nigar Awards. BBC Urdu made it in the list of 10 Best selected Pakistani cinema films.

Plot 
A Sikh woman Rani/Rano Sangeeta who lives in East Punjab with her in laws. When Rano suddenly becomes widowed after her husband dies in a horse & carriage accident, she struggles to bring up her children. Her in-laws come with a marriage proposal and forcibly asks her to get married to Rano's brother-in-law Mangal Nadeem Baig who is in love with a vegetable sellers daughter Lajjo Kaveeta and who is way younger than her and who always saw her as a sister in law.

Cast 
 Nadeem Baig - Mangal
 Shehla Gill
 Sangeeta - Rano
 Ghulam Mohiuddin as Ghulam Mohi-Vo-Din
 Kaveeta - Lajjo

Remake 

The film was remade as a television series with same title, directed by Sangeeta and aired in 2008.

Awards and nominations

References

External links 
 

1978 films
1970s Urdu-language films
Pakistani drama films
Indian novels adapted into films
Films set in Pakistan
Films shot in Pakistan
Nigar Award winners
Films scored by Kamal Ahmed
Urdu-language Pakistani films